The text Tài Xuán Jīng ("Canon of Supreme Mystery") is a guide for divination composed by the Confucian writer Yang Xiong (53 BCE – 18 CE). The first draft of this work was completed in 2 BCE (in the decade before the fall of the Western Han dynasty). During the Jin dynasty, an otherwise unknown person named Fan Wang salvaged the text and wrote a commentary on it, from which our text survives today.

The Taixuanjing is a divinatory text similar to, and inspired by, the I Ching (Yijing).  Whereas the I Ching is based on 64 binary hexagrams (sequences of six horizontal lines each of which may be broken or unbroken), the Taixuanjing employs 81 ternary tetragrams (sequences of four lines, each of which may be unbroken, broken once, or broken twice). Like the I Ching it may be consulted as an oracle by casting yarrow stalks or a six-faced die to generate numbers which define the lines of a tetragram, which can then be looked up in the text. 

A tetragram drawn without moving lines refers to the tetragram description, while a tetragram drawn with moving lines refers to the specific lines.

The monograms are:
 the unbroken line ( ⚊) for heaven,
 once broken line ( ⚋) for earth,
 twice broken line ( 𝌀) for man.

Numerically the symbols can be counted as ⚊ = 0, ⚋ = 1, 𝌀 = 2, and grouped into sets of four to count from 0 to 80.  This is clearly intentional as this passage from chapter 8 of the Tài Xuán Jīng points out the principle of carrying and place value.

Translation

An English translation by Michael Nylan was published in 1993.

Unicode

In the Unicode Standard, the Tai Xuan Jing Symbols block is an extension of the Yì Jīng symbols. Their Chinese aliases most accurately reflect their interpretation; for example, the Chinese alias of code point U+1D300 is "rén", which translates into English as man and yet the English alias is "MONOGRAM FOR EARTH".

Block

History
The following Unicode-related documents record the purpose and process of defining specific characters in the Tai Xuan Jing Symbols block:

See also
Bigram
Bagua – (I Ching)
Hexagram
Ternary numeral system

References

External links

 《太玄經》 - Full text in Chinese
 Canon of Supreme Mystery 《太玄經》 Chinese text with matching English vocabulary

Han dynasty texts
Chinese literature
Chinese books of divination
1st-century books
Unicode blocks